The First Little Russia Governorate (Ukrainian: Малоросійська губернія) or Government of Malorossiya was created by Russian authorities in 1764–65 after the abolition of Cossack Hetmanate in Ukrainian lands incorporated into the Russian Empire. The (First) Little Russia Governorate was governed by Pyotr Rumyantsev.

With another administrative reform of 1781 the governorate and its subdivisions (regiments) were liquidated and replaced with vice-royalties divided into counties (uyezds).

Subdivisions
The governorate was divided into 10 regiments (polk) which were equivalent to counties (uyezd).
  (1663–1782)
 
 
 Nizhyn Regiment
 Chernihiv Regiment
 Pryluky Regiment
 Lubny Regiment
 Myrhorod Regiment
 Hadiach Regiment
 Poltava Regiment

Coat of arms

Until 1767 the coat of arms for the governorate was Cossack with musket when it was replaced with the Russian double headed eagle.

References

 
States and territories disestablished in 1781
Governorates of the Russian Empire
Governorates of Ukraine
Political history of Ukraine
1764 establishments in the Russian Empire
1781 disestablishments in the Russian Empire
1760s in Ukraine
1770s in Ukraine
1780s in Ukraine